Haberlandia annetteae is a moth in the family Cossidae. It is found in the Central African Republic and possibly south-eastern Cameroon. The habitat consists of rainforests.

The wingspan is about 22 mm for males and 27 mm for females. The forewings are colonial buff with brown lines from the costal margin to the dorsum. The hindwings are colonial buff with a brown reticulated pattern in males. The hindwings of the females are ecru-olive.

Etymology
The species is named in honour of Annette Groß, a friend of the author.

References

Natural History Museum Lepidoptera generic names catalog

Moths described in 2011
Metarbelinae
Taxa named by Ingo Lehmann